The Lake Nevers is a vast body of fresh water in the Center-East part of Gouin Reservoir, in the territory of the town of La Tuque, in Haute-Mauricie, in the administrative region of Mauricie, in the province of Quebec, in Canada.

Toponymy 
The term "Nevers" is a family name of English origin.

The toponym "Lac Nevers" was made official on 18 December 1986 by the Commission de toponymie du Québec.

See also 
 Saint-Maurice River, a stream
 Champman Lake, a body of water
 Kaackakwakamak Lake, a body of water
 Bouzanquet Bay, a body of water
 Oasis Island, an island
 List of lakes in Canada

References 

Lakes of Mauricie
Gouin Reservoir